The Ministry of Agriculture and Agrarian Reform (MoAAR) is a government ministry office of the Syrian Arab Republic, responsible for agriculture affairs in Syria.

Ministers of Agriculture
Dr. Shibli al-Aysami (9 March 1963 – 11 November 1963)
Dr. Adil Tarabin (12 November 1963 – 21 December 1965)
Dr. Salah Wazzan (1 January 1966 – 22 February 1966)
Dr. Abd al-Karim al-Jundi (1 March 1966 – 15 October 1966)
Mr. Fayez Al Jassem (Oct 1966 – Oct 1969)
 Jamid Haddad (? – ?)
 Mohamad Haidar (1971-1976)
 Ahmed Qablan (1976-1980)
 Hamid Musker (1980-1981)
 Mash Jayden (1981-1985)
 Mahmoud al-Kurdi (1985-1987)
Dr. Mohamed Gabash (1 November 1987 – 1992)
Dr. Adel Safar (10 September 2003 – 14 April 2011)
Dr. Riyad Farid Hijab (14 April 2011 – 6 August 2012)
 Subhi Ahmed Abdullah (2012 – 2013)
 Ahmed Al-Qadri (9 February 2013 – 30 August 2020)
 Mohammed Hassan Qatana (since 30 August 2020)

See also
Ministry of Irrigation
National Agricultural Policy Center

External links
Ministry of Agriculture and Agrarian Reform

Syria
Agriculture and Agrarian Reform
Organizations based in Damascus
Agriculture in Syria
Agricultural organizations based in Asia
1948 establishments in Syria
Ministries established in 1948